Gadzhyrustamoba (also, Gadzhirustamoba) is a village in the Khachmaz Rayon of Azerbaijan. In Soviet times the village was the location of a small military base, which was dissolved in 1992. The military base was used as a testing ground for the T-72 tank, as the location in a semi-desert proved useful to assess the reliability of the tank in dusty and hot conditions.

References 

Populated places in Khachmaz District